Kualatahan is a genus of snakes belonging to the family Homalopsidae.

Species
Species:
 Kualatahan pahangensis (Tweedie, 1946)

References

Homalopsidae
Snake genera